The Great World is a 1990 Miles Franklin literary award-winning novel by the Australian author David Malouf. It is an epic novel telling the story of two Australians during the turmoil of World War I & II;  and second and the imprisonment of Japanese during World War - II.

Awards
Adelaide Festival Awards for Literature, National Fiction Award, 1992: winner
Prix Femina étranger (France), Best Foreign Novel, 1991: winner 
Miles Franklin Literary Award, 1991: winner
Commonwealth Writers Prize, Overall Best Book Award, 1991: winner
Commonwealth Writers Prize, South-East Asia and South Pacific Region, Best Book from the Region Award, 1991: winner
National Library of Australia National Audio Book-of-the-Year Award, 1990: joint winner

References

1990 Australian novels
Chatto & Windus books
Miles Franklin Award-winning works
Novels by David Malouf